Fahda bint Falah Al Hithlain is the third spouse of Salman bin Abdulaziz Al Saud, the king of Saudi Arabia. She is a member of the Ajman tribe. Her mother is Munira bint Abdullah and her ancestors include Ajman tribe leaders, Rakan and Dhaydan bin Hithlain.

Fahda has six children with King Salman: Prince Mohammed, Prince Turki, Prince Khalid, Prince Nayef, Prince Bandar and Prince Rakan. His second eldest son, Turki, is a businessman. Prince Khalid, her third eldest son, is the deputy minister of defense whereas Prince Bandar is the head of Royal Guard which deals with personal security of the King and Crown Prince.

In 2018 several US media outlets, including NBC, reported rumors that Fahda's eldest son, Crown Prince Mohammed, did not allow his mother to see King Salman. She was not involved in any public events between 2015 and 2020, but she reappeared at such events from March 2020.

References

External links

Fahda
Fahda
Living people
Fahda
Year of birth missing (living people)
Princesses by marriage